

Events

Pre-1600
 671 – Emperor Tenji of Japan introduces a water clock (clepsydra) called Rokoku. The instrument, which measures time and indicates hours, is placed in the capital of Ōtsu.
1190 – Third Crusade: Frederick I Barbarossa drowns in the river Saleph while leading an army to Jerusalem.
1329 – The Battle of Pelekanon results in a Byzantine defeat by the Ottoman Empire.
1523 – Copenhagen is surrounded by the army of Frederick I of Denmark, as the city will not recognise him as the successor of Christian II of Denmark.
1539 – Council of Trent: Pope Paul III sends out letters to his bishops, delaying the Council due to war and the difficulty bishops had traveling to Venice.
1596 – Willem Barents and Jacob van Heemskerk discover Bear Island.

1601–1900
1619 – Thirty Years' War: Battle of Záblatí, a turning point in the Bohemian Revolt.
1624 – Signing of the Treaty of Compiègne between France and the Netherlands.
1692 – Salem witch trials: Bridget Bishop is hanged at Gallows Hill near Salem, Massachusetts, for "certaine Detestable Arts called Witchcraft and Sorceries".
1719 – Jacobite risings: Battle of Glen Shiel.
1782 – King Buddha Yodfa Chulaloke (Rama I) of Siam (modern day Thailand) is crowned.
1786 – A landslide dam on the Dadu River created by an earthquake ten days earlier collapses, killing 100,000 in the Sichuan province of China.
1793 – The Jardin des Plantes museum opens in Paris. A year later, it becomes the first public zoo.
  1793   – French Revolution: Following the arrests of Girondin leaders, the Jacobins gain control of the Committee of Public Safety installing the revolutionary dictatorship.
1805 – First Barbary War: Yusuf Karamanli signs a treaty ending the hostilities between Tripolitania and the United States.
1829 – The first Boat Race between the University of Oxford and the University of Cambridge takes place on the Thames in London.
1838 – Myall Creek massacre: Twenty-eight Aboriginal Australians are murdered.
1854 – The United States Naval Academy graduates its first class of students.
1861 – American Civil War: Battle of Big Bethel: Confederate troops under John B. Magruder defeat a much larger Union force led by General Ebenezer W. Pierce in Virginia.
1863 – During the French intervention in Mexico, Mexico City is captured by French troops.
1864 – American Civil War: Battle of Brice's Crossroads: Confederate troops under Nathan Bedford Forrest defeat a much larger Union force led by General Samuel D. Sturgis in Mississippi.
1868 – Mihailo Obrenović III, Prince of Serbia is assassinated.
1871 – Sinmiyangyo: Captain McLane Tilton leads 109 US Marines in a naval attack on Han River forts on Kanghwa Island, Korea.
1878 – League of Prizren is established, to oppose the decisions of the Congress of Berlin and the Treaty of San Stefano, as a consequence of which the Albanian lands in the Balkans were being partitioned and given to the neighbor states of Serbia, Montenegro, Bulgaria, and Greece.
1886 – Mount Tarawera in New Zealand erupts, killing 153 people and burying the famous Pink and White Terraces. Eruptions continue for three months creating a large, 17 km long fissure across the mountain peak.
1898 – Spanish–American War: In the Battle of Guantánamo Bay, U.S. Marines begin the American invasion of Spanish-held Cuba.

1901–present
1916 – The Arab Revolt against the Ottoman Empire was declared by Hussein bin Ali, Sharif of Mecca.
1918 – The Austro-Hungarian battleship  sinks off the Croatian coast after being torpedoed by an Italian MAS motorboat; the event is recorded by camera from a nearby vessel.
1924 – Fascists kidnap and kill Italian Socialist leader Giacomo Matteotti in Rome.
1935 – Dr. Robert Smith takes his last drink, and Alcoholics Anonymous is founded in Akron, Ohio, United States, by him and Bill Wilson.
  1935   – Chaco War ends: A truce is called between Bolivia and Paraguay who had been fighting since 1932.
1940 – World War II: Fascist Italy declares war on France and the United Kingdom, beginning an invasion of southern France.
  1940   – World War II: U.S. President Franklin D. Roosevelt denounces Italy's actions in his "Stab in the Back" speech at the graduation ceremonies of the University of Virginia.
  1940   – World War II: Military resistance to the German occupation of Norway ends.
1942 – World War II: The Lidice massacre is perpetrated as a reprisal for the assassination of Obergruppenführer Reinhard Heydrich.
1944 – World War II: Six hundred forty-two men, women and children massacred at Oradour-sur-Glane, France. 
  1944   – World War II: In Distomo, Boeotia, Greece, 218 men, women and children are massacred by German troops.
  1944   – In baseball, 15-year-old Joe Nuxhall of the Cincinnati Reds becomes the youngest player ever in a major-league game.
1945 – Australian Imperial Forces land in Brunei Bay to liberate Brunei.
1947 – Saab produces its first automobile.
1957 – John Diefenbaker leads the Progressive Conservative Party of Canada to a stunning upset in the 1957 Canadian federal election, ending 22 years of Liberal Party government.
1960 – Trans Australia Airlines Flight 538 crashes near Mackay Airport in Mackay, Queensland, Australia, killing 29.
1963 – The Equal Pay Act of 1963, aimed at abolishing wage disparity based on sex, was signed into law by John F. Kennedy as part of his New Frontier Program.
1964 – United States Senate breaks a 75-day filibuster against the Civil Rights Act of 1964, leading to the bill's passage.
1967 – The Six-Day War ends: Israel and Syria agree to a cease-fire.
1977 – James Earl Ray escapes from Brushy Mountain State Penitentiary in Petros, Tennessee. He is recaptured three days later.
1980 – The African National Congress in South Africa publishes a call to fight from their imprisoned leader Nelson Mandela.
1982 – Lebanon War: The Syrian Arab Army defeats the Israeli Defense Forces in the Battle of Sultan Yacoub.
1990 – British Airways Flight 5390 lands safely at Southampton Airport after a blowout in the cockpit causes the captain to be partially sucked from the cockpit. There are no fatalities.
1991 – Eleven-year-old Jaycee Lee Dugard is kidnapped in South Lake Tahoe, California; she would remain a captive until 2009.
1994 – China conducts a nuclear test for DF-31 warhead at Area C (Beishan), Lop Nur, its prominence being due to the Cox Report.
1996 – Peace talks begin in Northern Ireland without the participation of Sinn Féin.
1997 – Before fleeing his northern stronghold, Khmer Rouge leader Pol Pot orders the killing of his defense chief Son Sen and 11 of Sen's family members.
1999 – Kosovo War: NATO suspends its airstrikes after Slobodan Milošević agrees to withdraw Serbian forces from Kosovo.
2001 – Pope John Paul II canonizes Lebanon's first female saint, Saint Rafqa.
2002 – The first direct electronic communication experiment between the nervous systems of two humans is carried out by Kevin Warwick in the United Kingdom.
2003 – The Spirit rover is launched, beginning NASA's Mars Exploration Rover mission.
2008 – Sudan Airways Flight 109 crashes at Khartoum International Airport, killing 30 people.
2009 – Eighty-eight year-old James Wenneker von Brunn opens fire inside the United States Holocaust Memorial Museum and fatally shoots Museum Special Police Officer Stephen Tyrone Johns. Other security guards returned fire, wounding von Brunn, who was apprehended.
2018 – Opportunity rover, sends it last message back to earth. The mission was finally declared over on February 13, 2019.
2019 – An Agusta A109E Power crashes onto the AXA Equitable Center on Seventh Avenue in Manhattan, New York City, sparking a fire on the top of the building. The pilot of the helicopter is killed.

Births

Pre-1600
 867 – Emperor Uda of Japan (d. 931)
 940 – Abu al-Wafa' Buzjani, Persian mathematician and astronomer (d. 998)
1213 – Fakhr-al-Din Iraqi, Persian poet and philosopher (d. 1289)
1465 – Mercurino Gattinara, Italian statesman and jurist (d. 1530)
1513 – Louis, Duke of Montpensier (1561–1582) (d. 1582)
1557 – Leandro Bassano, Italian painter (d. 1622)

1601–1900
1632 – Esprit Fléchier, French bishop and author (d. 1710)
1688 – James Francis Edward Stuart, claimant to the English and Scottish throne (d. 1766)
1713 – Princess Caroline of Great Britain (d. 1757)
1716 – Carl Gustaf Ekeberg, Swedish physician and explorer (d. 1784)
1753 – William Eustis, American physician and politician, 12th Governor of Massachusetts (d. 1825)
1804 – Hermann Schlegel, German ornithologist and herpetologist (d. 1884)
1819 – Gustave Courbet, French-Swiss painter and sculptor (d. 1877)
1825 – Sondre Norheim, Norwegian-American skier (d. 1897)
1832 – Edwin Arnold, English poet and journalist (d. 1904)
  1832   – Nicolaus Otto, German engineer (d. 1891)
1832 – Stephen Mosher Wood, American lieutenant and politician (d. 1920)
1835 – Rebecca Latimer Felton, American educator and politician (d. 1930)
1839 – Ludvig Holstein-Ledreborg, Danish lawyer and politician, 19th Prime Minister of Denmark (d. 1912)
1840 – Theodor Philipsen, Danish painter (d. 1920)
1843 – Heinrich von Herzogenberg, Austrian composer and conductor (d. 1900)
1854 – Sarah Grand, Irish feminist writer (d. 1943)
1859 – Emanuel Nobel, Swedish-Russian businessman (d. 1932)
1862 – Mrs. Leslie Carter, American actress (d. 1937)
1863 – Louis Couperus, Dutch author and poet (d. 1923)
1864 – Ninian Comper, Scottish architect (d. 1960)
1865 – Frederick Cook, American physician and explorer (d. 1940)
1878 – Margarito Bautista, Nahua-Mexican evangelizer, theologian, and religious founder (d. 1961)
1880 – André Derain, French painter and sculptor (d. 1954)
1882 – Nils Økland, Norwegian Esperantist and teacher (d. 1969)
1884 – Leone Sextus Tollemache, English captain (d. 1917)
1886 – Sessue Hayakawa, Japanese actor and producer (d. 1973)
1891 – Al Dubin, Swiss-American songwriter (d. 1945)
1895 – Hattie McDaniel, American actress (d. 1952)
1897 – Grand Duchess Tatiana Nikolaevna of Russia (d. 1918)
1898 – Princess Marie-Auguste of Anhalt (d. 1983)
1899 – Stanisław Czaykowski, Polish racing driver (d. 1933)

1901–present
1901 – Frederick Loewe, Austrian-American composer (d. 1988)
1904 – Lin Huiyin, Chinese architect and poet (d. 1955)
1907 – Fairfield Porter, American painter and critic (d. 1975)
  1907   – Dicky Wells, American jazz trombonist (d. 1985)
1909 – Lang Hancock, Australian soldier and businessman (d. 1992)
1910 – Frank Demaree, American baseball player and manager (d. 1958)
  1910   – Howlin' Wolf, American singer-songwriter and guitarist (d. 1976)
1911 – Ralph Kirkpatrick, American harpsichord player and musicologist (d. 1984)
  1911   – Terence Rattigan, English playwright and screenwriter (d. 1977)
1912 – Jean Lesage, Canadian lawyer and politician, 11th Premier of Quebec (d. 1980)
1913 – Tikhon Khrennikov, Russian pianist and composer (d. 2007)
  1913   – Benjamin Shapira, German-Israeli biochemist and academic (d. 1993)
1914 – Oktay Rıfat Horozcu, Turkish poet and playwright (d. 1988)
1915 – Saul Bellow, Canadian-American novelist, essayist and short story writer, Nobel Prize laureate (d. 2005)
1916 – Peride Celal, Turkish author (d. 2013)
  1916   – William Rosenberg, American entrepreneur, founded Dunkin' Donuts (d. 2002)
1918 – Patachou, French singer and actress (d. 2015)
  1918   – Barry Morse, English-Canadian actor and director (d. 2008)
1919 – Haidar Abdel-Shafi, Palestinian physician and politician (d. 2007)
  1919   – Kevin O'Flanagan, Irish footballer, rugby player, and physician (d. 2006)
1921 – Prince Philip, Duke of Edinburgh (d. 2021)
  1921   – Jean Robic, French cyclist (d. 1980)
1922 – Judy Garland, American actress and singer (d. 1969)
  1922   – Bill Kerr, South African-Australian actor (d. 2014)
  1922   – Mitchell Wallace, Australian rugby league player (d. 2016)
1923 – Paul Brunelle, Canadian singer-songwriter and guitarist (d. 1994)
  1923   – Robert Maxwell, Czech-English captain, publisher, and politician (d. 1991)
1924 – Friedrich L. Bauer, German mathematician, computer scientist, and academic (d. 2015)
1925 – Leo Gravelle, Canadian ice hockey player (d. 2013)
  1925   – Nat Hentoff, American historian, author, and journalist (d. 2017)
  1925   – James Salter, American novelist and short-story writer (d. 2015)
1926 – Bruno Bartoletti, Italian conductor (d. 2013)
  1926   – Lionel Jeffries, English actor, screenwriter and film director (d. 2010)
1927 – Claudio Gilberto Froehlich, Brazilian zoologist
  1927   – László Kubala, Hungarian footballer, coach, and manager (d. 2002)
  1927   – Lin Yang-kang, Chinese politician, 29th Vice Premier of the Republic of China (d. 2013)
  1927   – Johnny Orr, American basketball player and coach (d. 2013)
  1927   – Eugene Parker, American astrophysicist and academic (d. 2022)
1928 – Maurice Sendak, American author and illustrator (d. 2012)
1929 – James McDivitt, American general, pilot, and astronaut (d. 2022)
  1929   – Ian Sinclair, Australian farmer and politician, 42nd Australian Minister for Defence
  1929   – Thomas Taylor, Baron Taylor of Blackburn, British Labour Party politician (d. 2016)
  1929   – E. O. Wilson, American biologist, author, and academic (d. 2021)
1930 – Aranka Siegal, Czech-American author and Holocaust survivor
  1930   – Carmen Cozza, American baseball and football player (d. 2018)
  1930   – Chen Xitong, Chinese politician, 8th Mayor of Beijing (d. 2013)
1931 – Bryan Cartledge, English academic and diplomat, British Ambassador to Russia
  1931   – João Gilberto, Brazilian singer-songwriter and guitarist (d. 2019)
1932 – Pierre Cartier, French mathematician and academic
1933 – Chuck Fairbanks, American football player and coach (d. 2013)
1934 – Peter Gibson, English lawyer and judge
  1934   – Tom Pendry, Baron Pendry, English politician
1935 – Vic Elford, English racing driver
  1935   – Lu Jiaxi, Chinese self-taught mathematician (d. 1983)
  1935   – Yoshihiro Tatsumi, Japanese author and illustrator (d. 2015)
1938 – Rahul Bajaj, Indian businessman and politician (d. 2022)
  1938   – Violetta Villas, Belgian-Polish singer-songwriter and actress (d. 2011)
  1938   – Vasanti N. Bhat-Nayak, Indian mathematician and academic (d. 2009)
1940 – Augie Auer, American-New Zealand meteorologist (d. 2007)
  1940   – John Stevens, English drummer (d. 1994)
1941 – Mickey Jones, American drummer (d. 2018)
  1941   – Shirley Owens, American singer
  1941   – Jürgen Prochnow, German actor
  1941   – David Walker, Australian racing driver
1942 – Gordon Burns, Northern Irish journalist
  1942   – Chantal Goya, French singer and actress
  1942   – Arthur Hamilton, Lord Hamilton, Scottish lawyer and judge
  1942   – Preston Manning, Canadian politician
1943 – Simon Jenkins, English journalist and author
1944 – Ze'ev Friedman, Polish-Israeli weightlifter (d. 1972)
  1944   – Rick Price, English rock bass player (d. 2022)
1947 – Michel Bastarache, Canadian businessman, lawyer, and jurist
  1947   – Ken Singleton, American baseball player and sportscaster
  1947   – Robert Wright, English air marshal
1950 – Elías Sosa, Dominican-American baseball player
1951 – Dan Fouts, American football player and sportscaster
  1951   – Tony Mundine, Australian boxer
  1951   – Burglinde Pollak, German pentathlete
1952 – Kage Baker, American author (d. 2010)
1953 – Eileen Cooper, English painter and academic
  1953   – John Edwards, American lawyer and politician
  1953   – Garry Hynes, Irish director and producer
  1953   – Christine St-Pierre, Canadian journalist and politician
1954 – Moya Greene, Canadian businesswoman
  1954   – Rich Hall, American actor, producer, and screenwriter
1955 – Annette Schavan, German theologian and politician
  1955   – Andrew Stevens, American actor and producer
1957 – Nicola Palazzo, Italian writer
1958 – Yu Suzuki, Japanese game designer and producer
1959 – Carlo Ancelotti, Italian footballer and manager
  1959   – Ernie C, American heavy metal guitarist, songwriter, and producer
  1959   – Eliot Spitzer, American lawyer and politician, 54th Governor of New York
1960 – Nandamuri Balakrishna, Indian film actor and politician
1961 – Kim Deal, American singer-songwriter and musician 
  1961   – Maxi Priest, English singer-songwriter
1962 – Gina Gershon, American actress, singer and author
  1962   – Anderson Bigode Herzer, Brazilian poet and author (d. 1982)
  1962   – Wong Ka Kui, Hong Kong singer-songwriter and guitarist (d. 1993)
  1962   – Tzi Ma, Hong Kong American character actor
  1962   – Brent Sutter, Canadian ice hockey player and coach
1963 – Brad Henry, American lawyer and politician, 26th Governor of Oklahoma
  1963   – Jeanne Tripplehorn, American actress
1965 – Susanne Albers, German computer scientist and academic
  1965   – Elizabeth Hurley, English model, actress, and producer
  1965   – Joey Santiago, American alternative rock musician
1966 – David Platt, English footballer and manager
1967 – Emma Anderson, English singer-songwriter and guitarist 
  1967   – Darren Robinson, American rapper (d. 1995)
  1967   – Elizabeth Wettlaufer, Canadian nurse and serial killer
1968 – Bill Burr, American comedian and actor
  1968   – Derek Dooley, American football player and coach
1969 – Craig Hancock, Australian rugby league player
  1969   – Ronny Johnsen, Norwegian footballer
  1969   – Kate Snow, American journalist
1970 – Mike Doughty, American singer-songwriter and guitarist 
  1970   – Katsuhiro Harada, Japanese game designer, director, and producer
  1970   – Alex Santos, Filipino journalist
  1970   – Shane Whereat, Australian rugby league player
  1970   – Sarah Wixey, Welsh sport shooter
1971 – JoJo Hailey, American singer
  1971   – Bobby Jindal, American journalist and politician, 55th Governor of Louisiana
  1971   – Bruno Ngotty, French footballer
  1971   – Erik Rutan, American singer-songwriter, guitarist, and producer
  1971   – Kyle Sandilands, Australian radio and television host
1972 – Steven Fischer, American director and producer
  1972   – Radmila Šekerinska, Macedonian politician, Prime Minister of the Republic of Macedonia
  1972   – Eric Upashantha, Sri Lankan cricketer
1973 – Faith Evans, American singer-songwriter, producer, and actress
  1973   – Flesh-n-Bone, American rapper and actor
  1973   – Pokey Reese, American baseball player 
1974 – Dustin Lance Black, American screenwriter, director, film and television producer, and LGBT rights activist
1975 – Henrik Pedersen, Danish footballer
1976 – Alari Lell, Estonian footballer
  1976   – Esther Ouwehand, Dutch politician
  1976   – Stefan Postma, Dutch footballer and coach
  1976   – Hadi Saei, Iranian martial artist
1977 – Adam Darski (Nergal), Polish singer-songwriter and guitarist 
  1977   – Mike Rosenthal, American football player and coach
1978 – Raheem Brock, American football player
1979 – Evgeni Borounov, Russian ice dancer and coach
  1979   – Kostas Louboutis, Greek footballer
1980 – Jessica DiCicco, American actress and voice actress
  1980   – Matuzalém, Brazilian footballer
  1980   – Ovie Mughelli, American football player
  1980   – Dmitri Uchaykin, Russian ice hockey player (d. 2013)
  1980   – Daniele Seccarecci, Italian bodybuilder (d. 2013)
1981 – Mat Jackson, English racing driver
  1981   – Albie Morkel, South African cricketer
  1981   – Andrey Yepishin, Russian sprinter
1982 – Tara Lipinski, American figure skater
  1982   – Princess Madeleine, Duchess of Hälsingland and Gästrikland
  1982   – Ana Lúcia Souza, Brazilian ballerina and journalist
1983 – Jade Bailey, Barbadian athlete
  1983   – Marion Barber III, American football player (d. 2022)
  1983   – Aaron Davey, Australian footballer
  1983   – Leelee Sobieski, American actress and producer
  1983   – Steve von Bergen, Swiss footballer
1984 – Johanna Kedzierski, German sprinter
  1984   – Dirk Van Tichelt, Belgian martial artist
1985 – Richard Chambers, Irish rower
  1985   – Celina Jade, Hong Kong-American actress
  1985   – Kaia Kanepi, Estonian tennis player
  1985   – Andy Schleck, Luxembourger cyclist
  1985   – Vasilis Torosidis, Greek footballer
1986 – Al Alburquerque, Dominican baseball player
  1986   – Marco Andreolli, Italian footballer
1987 – Martin Harnik, German-Austrian footballer
  1987   – Amobi Okoye, Nigerian-American football player
1988 – Jeff Teague, American basketball player
1989 – David Miller, South African cricketer
  1989   – Mustapha Carayol, Gambian footballer
  1989   – Alexandra Stan, Romanian singer-songwriter, dancer, and model
1991 – Alexa Scimeca Knierim, American figure skater
1992 – Kate Upton, American model and actress 
1996 – Wen Junhui, Chinese singer 
1997 – Cheung Ka-long, Hong Kong foil fencer, 2020 Olympic champion
1998 – Ryan Papenhuyzen, Australian rugby league player

Deaths

Pre-1600
323 BC – Alexander the Great, Macedonian king (b. 356 BC)
AD 38 – Julia Drusilla, Roman sister of Caligula (b. 16 AD)
 223 – Liu Bei, Chinese emperor (b. 161)
 779 – Emperor Daizong of Tang (b. 727)
 754 – Abul Abbas al-Saffah, Muslim caliph (b. 721)
 871 – Odo I, Frankish nobleman
 903 – Cheng Rui, Chinese warlord
 932 – Dong Zhang, Chinese general
 942 – Liu Yan, emperor of Southern Han (b. 889)
1075 – Ernest, Margrave of Austria (b. 1027)
1141 – Richenza of Northeim (b. 1087)
1190 – Frederick I, Holy Roman Emperor (b. 1122)
1261 – Matilda of Brandenburg, Duchess of Brunswick-Lüneburg (b. 1210)
1338 – Kitabatake Akiie, Japanese governor (b. 1318)
1364 – Agnes of Austria (b. 1281)
1424 – Ernest, Duke of Austria (b. 1377)
1437 – Joan of Navarre, Queen of England (b. 1370)
1468 – Idris Imad al-Din, supreme leader of Tayyibi Isma'ilism, scholar and historian (b. 1392)
1552 – Alexander Barclay, English poet and author (b. 1476)
1556 – Martin Agricola, German composer and theorist (b. 1486)
1580 – Luís de Camões, Portuguese poet (b. 1524–25)

1601–1900
1604 – Isabella Andreini, Italian actress (b. 1562)
1607 – John Popham, English politician, Attorney General for England and Wales (b. 1531)
1654 – Alessandro Algardi, Italian sculptor (b. 1598)
1680 – Johan Göransson Gyllenstierna, Swedish lawyer and politician (b. 1635)
1692 – Bridget Bishop, Colonial Massachusetts woman hanged as a witch during the Salem witch trials (b. 1632)
1735 – Thomas Hearne, English historian and author (b. 1678)
1753 – Joachim Ludwig Schultheiss von Unfriedt, German architect (b. 1678)
1776 – Hsinbyushin, Burmese king (b. 1736)
  1776   – Leopold Widhalm, Austrian instrument maker (b. 1722)
1791 – Toussaint-Guillaume Picquet de la Motte, French admiral (b. 1720)
1799 – Chevalier de Saint-Georges, Caribbean-French violinist, composer, and conductor (b. 1745)
1811 – Charles Frederick, Grand Duke of Baden (b. 1728)
1831 – Hans Karl von Diebitsch, German-Russian field marshal (b. 1785)
1836 – André-Marie Ampère, French physicist and mathematician (b. 1775)
1849 – Thomas Robert Bugeaud, French general and politician (b. 1784)
  1849   – Robert Brown, Scottish botanist (b. 1773)
1868 – Mihailo Obrenović III, Prince of Serbia (b. 1823)
1899 – Ernest Chausson, French composer (b. 1855)

1901–present
1901 – Robert Williams Buchanan, Scottish poet, author, and playwright (b. 1841)
1902 – Jacint Verdaguer, Catalan priest and poet (b. 1845)
1906 – Richard Seddon, English-New Zealand politician, 15th Prime Minister of New Zealand (b. 1845)
1909 – Edward Everett Hale, American minister, historian, and author (b. 1822)
1914 – Ödön Lechner, Hungarian architect (b. 1845)
1918 – Arrigo Boito, Italian author, poet, and composer (b. 1842)
1923 – Pierre Loti, French soldier and author (b. 1850)
1924 – Giacomo Matteotti, Italian lawyer and politician (b. 1885)
1926 – Antoni Gaudí, Spanish architect, designed the Park Güell (b. 1852)
1930 – Adolf von Harnack, German historian and theologian (b. 1851)
1934 – Frederick Delius, English composer and educator (b. 1862)
1936 – John Bowser, English-Australian politician, 26th Premier of Victoria (b. 1856)
1937 – Robert Borden, Canadian lawyer and politician, 8th Prime Minister of Canada (b. 1854)
1939 – Albert Ogilvie, Australian politician, 28th Premier of Tasmania (b. 1890)
1940 – Marcus Garvey, Jamaican journalist and activist, founded the Black Star Line (b. 1887)
1944 – Willem Jacob van Stockum, Dutch mathematician and academic (b. 1910)
1946 – Jack Johnson, American boxer (b. 1878)
1947 – Alexander Bethune, Canadian businessman and politician, 12th Mayor of Vancouver (b. 1852)
1949 – Sigrid Undset, Danish-Norwegian novelist, essayist, and translator, Nobel Prize laureate (b. 1882)
1955 – Margaret Abbott, Indian-American golfer (b. 1876)
1958 – Angelina Weld Grimké, American journalist, poet, and playwright (b. 1880)
1959 – Zoltán Meskó, Hungarian politician (b. 1883)
1963 – Timothy Birdsall, English cartoonist (b. 1936)
1965 – Vahap Özaltay, Turkish footballer and manager (b. 1908)
1967 – Spencer Tracy, American actor (b. 1900)
1971 – Michael Rennie, English actor (b. 1909)
1973 – William Inge, American playwright and novelist (b. 1913)
1974 – Prince Henry, Duke of Gloucester (b. 1900)
1976 – Adolph Zukor, American film producer, co-founded Paramount Pictures (b. 1873)
1982 – Rainer Werner Fassbinder, German actor, director, and screenwriter (b. 1945)
1984 – Halide Nusret Zorlutuna, Turkish author and poet (b. 1901)
1986 – Merle Miller, American author and playwright (b. 1919)
1987 – Elizabeth Hartman, American actress (b. 1943)
1988 – Louis L'Amour, American novelist and short story writer (b. 1908)
1991 – Jean Bruller, French author and illustrator, co-founded Les Éditions de Minuit (b. 1902)
1992 – Hachidai Nakamura, Chinese-Japanese pianist and composer (b. 1931)
1993 – Les Dawson, English comedian, actor, writer and presenter (b. 1931)
1996 – George Hees, Canadian soldier, football player, and politician (b. 1910)
  1996   – Jo Van Fleet, American actress (b. 1915) 
1998 – Jim Hearn, American baseball player (b. 1921)
  1998   – Hammond Innes, English soldier and author (b. 1914)
2000 – Hafez al-Assad, Syrian general and politician, 18th President of Syria (b. 1930)
  2000   – Brian Statham, English cricketer (b. 1930)
2001 – Leila Pahlavi, Princess of Iran (b. 1970)
2002 – John Gotti, American mobster (b. 1940)
2003 – Donald Regan, American colonel and politician, 11th White House Chief of Staff (b. 1918)
  2003   – Bernard Williams, English philosopher and academic (b. 1929)
  2003   – Phil Williams, Welsh academic and politician (b. 1939)
2004 – Ray Charles, American singer-songwriter, pianist, and actor (b. 1930)
  2004   – Odette Laure, French actress and singer (b. 1917)
  2004   – Xenophon Zolotas, Greek economist and politician, 177th Prime Minister of Greece (b. 1904)
2005 – Curtis Pitts, American aircraft designer, designed the Pitts Special (b. 1915)
2007 – Augie Auer, American-New Zealand meteorologist (b. 1940)
2008 – Chinghiz Aitmatov, Kyrgyzstani author and diplomat (b. 1928)
2009 – Stelios Skevofilakas, Greek footballer (b. 1940)
2010 – Basil Schott, American archbishop (b. 1939)
  2010   – Sigmar Polke, German painter and photographer (b. 1941)
2011 – Brian Lenihan Jnr, Irish lawyer and politician, 25th Irish Minister for Finance (b. 1959)
2012 – Piero Bellugi, Italian conductor (b. 1924)
  2012   – Warner Fusselle, American sportscaster (b. 1944)
  2012   – Will Hoebee, Dutch songwriter and producer (b. 1947)
  2012   – Georges Mathieu, French painter and academic (b. 1921)
  2012   – Joshua Orwa Ojode, Kenyan politician (b. 1958)
  2012   – George Saitoti, Kenyan economist and politician, 6th Vice-President of Kenya (b. 1945)
  2012   – Sudono Salim, Chinese-Indonesian businessman, founded Bank Central Asia (b. 1916)
  2012   – Gordon West, English footballer (b. 1943)
2013 – Doug Bailey, American political consultant (b. 1933)
  2013   – Enrique Orizaola, Spanish footballer and coach (b. 1922)
  2013   – Barbara Vucanovich, American lawyer and politician (b. 1921)
2014 – Marcello Alencar, Brazilian lawyer and politician, 57th Governor of Rio de Janeiro (b. 1925)
  2014   – Gary Gilmour, Australian cricketer and manager (b. 1951)
  2014   – Robert M. Grant, American theologian and academic (b. 1917)
  2014   – Jack Lee, American radio host and politician (b. 1920)
2015 – Robert Chartoff, American film producer and philanthropist (b. 1933)
  2015   – Wolfgang Jeschke, German author and publisher (b. 1936)
2016 – Christina Grimmie, American singer-songwriter (b. 1994)
  2016   – Gordie Howe, Canadian ice hockey player (b. 1928)
2017 – Julia Perez, Indonesian singer and actress (b. 1980)
2018 – Neal E. Boyd, American singer, winner of the 2008 season of America's Got Talent (b. 1975)
2020 – Claudell Washington, American baseball player (b. 1954)

Holidays and observances
Abolition Day (French Guiana)
Army Day (Jordan)
World Art Nouveau Day (Worldwide)
Christian feast day:
Bardo
Getulius, Amancius and Cerealus
Guardian Angel of Portugal
John of Tobolsk (Russian Orthodox Church)
Landry of Paris  
Maurinus of Cologne
Maximus of Aveia (or of Aquila)
Maximus of Naples
Olivia
June 10 (Eastern Orthodox liturgics)
Navy Day (Italy)
Portugal Day, also Day of Camões (Portugal and the Portuguese communities) 
Reconciliation Day (Republic of the Congo)

Notes

References

External links

 
 
 

Days of the year
June